Michael Scott Jr. is an American politician, business executive, and member of the Chicago Board of Education. From 2015 to 2022, he served as an alderman in the Chicago City Council representing the 24th ward, which includes portions of North Lawndale, South Austin and West Garfield Park. He is a member of the  Democratic Party and was a member of the Chicago Aldermanic Black Caucus while in City Council.

Early life and career 
Prior to serving on City Council, Scott worked for the Chicago Park District, Chicago Public Schools, the Public Building Commission, and After School Matters.

Chicago City Council
Scott was first elected the alderman for the 24th ward in 2015, replacing outgoing alderman Michael Chandler.

Scott served on the following City Council committees: Budget and Government Operations; Rules and Ethics; Economic, Capital and Technology Development; Education and Child Development; Housing and Real Estate; License and Consumer Protection; and Special Events, Cultural Affairs and Recreation.

In the runoff of the 2019 Chicago mayoral election, Scott endorsed Lori Lightfoot. Scott was a City Council ally of Lightfoot after she became mayor.

On May 24, 2022, Scott announced that he would retire from the City Council and join Cinespace Chicago Film Studios as the company's "Head of Industry and Community Relations." His resignation was effective on June 3, 2022. On June 21, Mayor Lori Lightfoot announced that she had nominated Scott's sister, Monique Scott, to fill the position for the remainder of his term, pending confirmation by the City Council. One July 15, Lighfoot announced her appointment of Michael Scott to the Chicago Board of Education.

Personal life 
Scott's father, Michael Scott Sr., served as Chicago Board of Education President under Mayor Richard M. Daley.

References

External links

1975 births
21st-century American politicians
African-American people in Illinois politics
Chicago City Council members
Illinois Democrats
Living people
Morehouse College alumni
21st-century African-American politicians
20th-century African-American people
Members of the Chicago Board of Education